Zarazúa is a Basque surname. Notable people with the surname include:

Renata Zarazúa (born 1997), Mexican tennis player
Rubén Zarazúa Rocha (born 1941), Mexican politician 
Vicente Zarazúa (born 1944), retired Mexican tennis player

Basque-language surnames